Statistics of Primera Fuerza in season 1941-42.

Overview
It was contested by 8 teams, and Club España won the championship.

League standings

Championship playoff

Top goalscorers
Players sorted first by goals scored, then by last name.

References
Mexico - List of final tables (RSSSF)

1941-42
1941–42 in Mexican football
Mex